Saint Peter's Preparatory School ("Saint Peter's Prep" or "Prep") is a private, all-male, Jesuit, college-preparatory school located in Jersey City, in Hudson County in the U.S. state of New Jersey, within the Roman Catholic Archdiocese of Newark. The Society of Jesus founded the school in 1872 and today the school is operated as part of the Jesuit East Province. The school has been accredited by the New Jersey Association of Independent Schools.

Students are enrolled from counties in Central and Northern New Jersey, as well as from nearby New York City. The school has a faculty of 83 that includes two Jesuits, 71 lay teachers, and 10 counselors, seven of whom work on college placement. Tuition for the 2022–23 school year is $21,311, while mandatory fees total $1,300.

As of the 2019–20 school year, the school had an enrollment of 892 students and 80.1 classroom teachers (on an FTE basis), for a student–teacher ratio of 11.1:1. The school's student body was 53.0% (473) White, 17.9% (160) Hispanic, 12.2% (109) Black, 8.5% (76) Asian, 8.0% (71) two or more races and 0.3% (3) Native Hawaiian/ Pacific Islander.

History

Foundation and growth
Saint Peter's Prep was founded in the Paulus Hook section of Jersey City as a department within Saint Peter's College (now Saint Peter's University) by an act of the New Jersey Legislature on April 3, 1872. Along with the Preparatory department were the Collegiate and Grammar departments. As a school for young men, Saint Peter's opened in September 1878 with seventy-one students in the Preparatory department. Academic degrees were first conferred in June 1889. At this time the only building on the campus was Shalloe Hall at 144 Grand Street. Mulry Hall, on the corner of Grand and Warren Streets, was built around the turn of the century as a local social club, before being acquired by the school.

Separation from the college
In 1918 Jesuit Superiors decided to close the college division in order to focus more attention on other Universities in the Northeast. It remained closed until 1930; during this time, however, the Preparatory division remained open. The college division reopened in another location in 1930 and in 1936 settled at its current location. The college and Preparatory departments were officially incorporated separately on February 10, 1955. Although Saint Peter's College has not been located at 144 Grand for over eighty years, at an entrance to the original building, Shalloe Hall, a window pane above the door still reads "Saint Peter's College."

Buildings
The original building, Shalloe Hall, is named after Francis J. Shalloe, S.J., and was built in the 1870s. Mulry Hall was dedicated in 1913. Across the street is the Humanities Building (previously known as the Freshman and Science Building and still commonly referred to as the English Building). This four-storied building was constructed in the 1880s and until 1924 housed the Academy of Saint Aloysius, an all-girls school. Prep acquired the building in 1924 and in 1995 completed a thorough renovation of the structure, including a revamping of the Siperstein Library. Hogan and Burke Halls on the west side of campus were constructed in 1942 and 1965–66, respectively. In 1948 the Memorial Gymnasium was dedicated. It is commonly referred to as "The Barn", from its unique shape.

In 2005 Prep completed the purchase of the vacant Saint Peter's Grammar School as well as the Saint Peter's Church adjacent to Prep's existing property. Recent renovations over the past twenty years include a remodeling of Warren Street as a pedestrian walkway during school hours, named after Pope John Paul II, the upgrade of the Humanities Building and Memorial Gymnasium, and the construction of James F. Keenan, S.J., field about three blocks away. The new field has provided the soccer, rugby, and lacrosse teams a home field, as well as practice space for the football and baseball teams.  Beginning in the 2010–2011 academic year the former church was converted into a temporary multi-purpose space to serve as the lunch room, renamed the "O'Keefe Commons." In October 2011, renovations of the 50-year-old Burke Hall were completed and the building was rechristened the "Moriarty Science Center." Major renovations on Mulry Hall began at the conclusion of the 2013–2014 school year, including an updated facade and modern classrooms.

Recent years and the future
On June 22, 2009, the board of trustees voted unanimously to approve phase one of the Campus Master Plan. Developed over several years, the plan lays out the future of Prep's campus.

Phase one included a remodeling of Saint Peter's Church into a temporary cafeteria/multi-purpose space known as the O'Keefe Commons. This was completed over the summer of 2010 in time for the beginning of the 2010 academic year. This phase also included a complete renovation of Burke Hall along Warren Street into a premier science building, including roof space for a greenhouse and other outdoor learning capabilities. A new main entrance along Warren Street was also constructed.

The remaining phases of the Master Plan were to be approved by the Board once funding for the remainder of the project was secured. Prep introduced a campaign, "Imagine: The Fund for Saint Peter's Prep," for the financing of the Master Plan projects. Total gifts, as of September 29, 2010, were over $13.6 million.

The other phases included the construction of a large multi-purpose space in the York Street parking lot, extensive renovations of Mulry Hall and Hogan Hall, a major reconfiguration of the former Jesuit residence, possible accommodation for underground parking, construction of a new academic building along York Street, and the conversion of the upper floors of the Humanities Building (former Freshman Building) into office space for non-academic administration and external affairs.

Hogan Hall was renovated in summer 2017, and renovation of Mulry Hall was completed soon after.

Academics
Students at Prep are required to take one year of Latin (two if they receive a scholarship), three years of mathematics (four years recommended), three years of history, two years of science (at least three years recommended), four years of English, two years (three years recommended) of modern language (Spanish, French, German or Italian), and four years of religion. Prep offers art and music classes for students wishing to broaden their creativity and to pursue the arts in college. Independent study courses include Greek Honors, Portfolio Art, and instrumental music.  Other elective classes are offered to juniors and seniors, and there are many honors and AP classes to choose from.  The school has inaugurated the John E. Browning, S.J., '46, Learning Center, which features resources for individual learning and a learning specialist.

Athletics

The St. Peter's Prep Marauders compete in the Hudson County Interscholastic League, which is comprised of public and private high schools in Hudson County, and operates under the supervision of the New Jersey State Interscholastic Athletic Association (NJSIAA). The school's teams wear maroon and white. With 1,416 students in grades 10–12, the school was classified by the NJSIAA for the 2019–20 school year as Non-Public A for most athletic competition purposes, which included schools with an enrollment of 381 to 1,454 in that grade range (equivalent to Group IV for public schools). The football team competes in the National Blue division of the North Jersey Super Football Conference, which includes 112 schools competing in 20 divisions, making it the nation's biggest football-only high school sports league. The school was classified by the NJSIAA as Non-Public Group IV for football for 2018–2020.

Saint Peter's offers 18 sports and 38 teams, including football, soccer, cross country, basketball, bowling, fencing, indoor track, wrestling, swimming, ice hockey, baseball, golf, volleyball, outdoor track, lacrosse, tennis, and rugby. In 2010, Prep inaugurated a club crew team which was made varsity in 2012, and in 2011 a club water polo team.

The boys basketball team won the Non-Public Group A state championship in 1949 (against runner-up Trenton Catholic High School in the playoff final), 1951-1953 (vs. Trenton Catholic all three years), 1954 (vs. St. Peter of New Brunswick), 1955 (vs, Trenton Catholic), 1956 (vs. St. Peter of New Brunswick) and 1959 (vs. Trenton Catholic). The program's eight state group titles are tied for seventh-most in the state and the streak of six state titles from 1951 to 1956 is the second longest. In front of a crowd of 2,000 at the Dillon Gymnasium at Princeton University, the 1956 team won its sixth consecutive Parochial A state title with a 65–48 win against New Brunswick's St. Peter in the championship game.

The boys track team won the Non-Public Group A spring track state championship in 1952 and 1953.

The girls basketball team won the Non-Public Group B state sectional championship in 1985 (against St. Anthony High School in the playoff finals), 1991 (vs. Immaculate Conception High School of Montclair) and 1992 (vs. DePaul Catholic High School).

The ice hockey team won the Handchen Cup in 1986. In the 2006–2007 season, they advanced to the final round after defeating Christian Brothers Academy 2–0. They played St. Augustine College Preparatory School in the NJSIAA championship, but fell 3–1.

The football team won the NJSIAA Non-Public A North state sectional championship in 1989 and in Non-Public Group IV in 1994 and 2005, 2014 and 2019. In 1994, the Saint Peter's Prep football team finished the season with an 11–0 record was ranked 6th in the nation by USA Today after upsetting top-ranked Bergen Catholic High School with a 26–24 win in the Non-Public Group IV championship game at Giants Stadium. The team won the 2005 Non-Public Group IV state championship defeating Don Bosco Prep 22–15. Saint Peters won the Non-Public Group IV championship in 2014, with a win over Paramus Catholic High School. The team won the 2019 Non-Public Group IV title at MetLife Stadium with a 21–14 win against Don Bosco Preparatory High School.

Prep has one of the most successful football organizations in New Jersey. On September 14, 2007, coach Rich Hansen surpassed coach Bill Cochrane as the all-time most-winning coach in Prep history, and was honored in a pre-game ceremony on September 28 against Bergen Catholic High School that was nationally televised on ESPNU. Coach Hansen set a record in the 2007 year, winning 70 consecutive HCIAA games.

On November 17, 2007, the Marauders beat Bergen Catholic by a score of 41–7. This victory advanced Prep to its third state sectional championship game in three years, all of which have been against Don Bosco Preparatory High School. On December 2, 2007, the Marauders played Don Bosco Prep again, and lost 42–14 in the Non-Public, Group IV sectional championship game. This was the third consecutive state championship game in which the two met, with Don Bosco winning two of three.

The wrestling team won the Non-Public A North state sectional championship in 2000 and 2001.

The Saint Peter's Prep volleyball team achieved 100 consecutive wins in Hudson County in 2006, but ended the winning streak at the county championships against Bayonne High School that same year.  It has consistently been ranked among the top ten teams of the state of New Jersey. The team won the 2007 Boys Volleyball - North state sectional championship over Bayonne High School (25-17, 25–20). The team moved on to play for the NJSIAA overall state championship on June 8, 2007, against East Brunswick High School,<ref>Battaglia, Joe. 2007 No. 5 St. Peter's downs No. 4 Bayonne, The Star-Ledger, June 7, 2007. Accessed May 7, 2007.</ref> falling 25–21, 25–22.

The Prep basketball team won the 2008 Hudson County Coviello Division Championship by defeating #2 seeded Union Hill by a score of 48–47. In the process they pulled off "upsets" against #1 seeded Bayonne, 79–76 in overtime, and #5 seeded Emerson in the 2nd round, 71–55. This marked the first time the #8 seed won the tournament.

The swimming team has won over three dozen county titles, holds the majority of Hudson County's swim records, and Prep swimmers and divers have accounted for more titles than any other team in the past 30 years. The team drew attention throughout the state in 2011 when beloved senior swimmer, B.J. Giannone, collapsed and died at a swim meet at Saint Peter's College (now Saint Peter's University). The team took on NJ #7 Scotch Plains, the school which Giannone's girlfriend swam for, only 3 days after his death. The crowd set unofficial records for attendance at a regular-season New Jersey high school dual meet. The team also wore sweatshirts printed with the number 20.67, the time that the official score board malfunctioned to in the 50 freestyle on B.J.'s last individual race on the night of his death. The saying "Live Like B.J." become popular among teammates, family, and friends, and some members of that team took to wearing bracelets with the saying. Giannone's memory was memorialized in 2013 with the creation of the annual B.J. Giannone Award for "embodying the spirit and camaraderie of B.J." Junior and team captain, Matt Jasko, who was a freshman on the team at the time of B.J.'s death, was the first to receive the honor. In 2014 the team won its 40th county title and finished ranked 8th in the state.

The Saint Peter's Prep Crew team is led by Coach Alex Canale. In 2013, the JV 4+ took first place at Stotesbury Cup Regatta, the largest high school regatta in the world. The team also won the SRAA National Championship Regatta and placed second at the Garden State championships. Along with the JV 4+, other Prep boats have succeeded in many regattas.

The fencing team won the overall state championship in 2017 and 2018, and was sabre team winner in 2017. In 2017, the Saint Peter's Prep fencing team defeated Columbia High School 16–11 to win the state championship, the second Prep team to win a state championship after the football team.

The boys soccer team won the Hudson County Tournament championships in 1976-1978, 1992-1994, 2001, 2005, 2011-2013 and 2019.

Campus ministry

Christian service
At Saint Peter's, each year of study includes a Christian Service requirement. Service is as follows:
Freshmen - 10 hours: fulfilled through Freshman Day of Service
Sophomores - 10 hours: fulfilled through club or athletic team service opportunities along with Koinonia.
Juniors - 60 hours: to be decided upon with direction from the Campus Ministry department.

At the end of his sophomore year, a student may participate in a summer immersion trip, typically lasting one week. Locations of trips include West Virginia, Camden, and the New York metropolitan area, among others. Completion of this trip fulfills a student's junior service requirement.

In the summer of 2007, the school introduced a senior service immersion experience in New Orleans. This program was continued in August 2008 as Prep sent 16 students and four faculty members to Covington, Louisiana to work with Habitat for Humanity.

The summer of 2009 saw the introduction of the school's first international service trip. Ten rising juniors and seniors, along with two faculty members, traveled to the Working Boys' Center in Quito, Ecuador. The group updated a blog with reflections and experiences throughout the trip.

Retreats
Retreats are an essential component of Saint Peter's Campus Ministry program. They provide students with the chance to step away from their busy lives and reflect on their relationships with God, family, and friends. The retreats also offer students an opportunity to reflect on themselves – providing them the time to examine who they are, where they come from, and what they believe in. The retreats are as follows:

Freshman "IgNite" Retreat: It occurs a few days before the regular school year begins.  Incoming freshman stay overnight with their homeroom at the school where they are introduced to Ignatian spirituality. This is mandatory for all freshmen.  Formerly, the retreat began after school and ended the following day. This retreat first took place in 2007.
Koinonia: This combines service and retreat in an Urban Immersion experience. As a homeroom, students spend a weekend together serving at a food bank and senior center in order to work with the poor and marginalized in society. The retreat shows the importance of "a faith that does justice."
Kairos: When translated from Greek, kairos means "the appropriate time" and is loosely translated as "God's Time." It is an opportunity for juniors to reflect on the presence of God in their everyday lives. The themes for the four-day retreat are based on Ignatius' Spiritual Exercises, and they challenge students to a deeper self-examination than the reflections of previous retreats. The first took place in 2007, and there are now six scheduled each year.
Emmaus: The Emmaus Retreat program has been a part of Prep since Fr. Ned Coughlin, S.J., directed the first "Emmaus Weekend" in 1977. A three-day retreat, Emmaus provides students with the opportunity to examine their own spirituality and their relationship with God, form a community with classmates and faculty members, and open their minds and hearts to the experiences, beliefs, and feelings of others. There are eight Emmaus retreats throughout the year. The retreat is optional, although most seniors attend. There have been over 260 Emmaus retreats over the years. Although the location of the retreat has changed over the years from the Jersey Shore to the mountains of Passaic County to its current location in Warwick, New York, the essence of the experience remains one that stays with Prep men for many years.

Formerly, Emmaus was a retreat available to juniors and Kairos for seniors; however, this changed in the 2011–2012 school year. Currently, Kairos is the junior retreat and Emmaus is the senior retreat.

Social justice issues
Starting in 1998, Prep has hosted an annual Arrupe Lecture, named after the former Superior General of the Society of Jesus Pedro Arrupe, on a social justice topic. From 1998 through 2008 this entailed a one-time lecture on such various topics as Jewish-Christian relations, the death penalty, and urban poverty. In 2009, under the direction of then-campus minister Ryan Heffernan, the program took a new direction, becoming a week-long program focused on social justice issues.

Prep also sends a delegation annually to Fort Benning, Georgia, to protest the Western Hemisphere Institute for Security Cooperation (WHINSEC, formerly the School of the Americas - SOA), which was implicated in the training of mainly Latin American military officers who later committed human rights violations in their home country, including the murder of six Jesuits in El Salvador.

Beginning in the 2009–2010 school year, Prep became home to the first microfinance organization to be run by high-school students.

 Notable alumni 

 Nick Acocella (1943–2020), political journalist and author
 Mark Armstrong, college basketball player for the Villanova Wildcats
 Lawrence Babbio Jr., former CEO of Verizon Wireless Corporation, now CEO of ADC Telecommunications Corp.
 Charles Beirne, S.J. (1938–2010, class of 1956), former President of Le Moyne College (2000–2007)
 George Blaney (born 1939), former player for the New York Knicks, who was Head Basketball Coach at Seton Hall and Holy Cross, and was Assistant Coach at UConn.
 Philip Bosco (1930-2018), Tony Award-winning actor (Broadway and Hollywood)Rohan, Virginia. "Seasoned star -- A distinctive voice helps make Haworth's Philip Bosco a frequent face in the cast", The Record, November 14, 2007. Accessed July 26, 2016. "It was at St. Peter's Prep High School in Jersey City that Bosco met his mentor, a retired actor named James Marr."
 Charles J. Catrillo (1945-2004), politician who served in the New Jersey General Assembly from the 32nd Legislative District from 1986 to 1988.
 Nicholas Chiaravalloti (born c. 1972, class of 1990), politician who represents the 31st Legislative District in the New Jersey General Assembly.
 Joe Dailey, American football coach who is the wide receivers coach for the Carolina Panthers
 Edward M. Daly (born 1965, class of 1983), four-star general in the United States Army who serves as the 20th commanding general of the U.S. Army Materiel Command.
 Jerry DeFuccio (1925–2001, class of 1943), editor of Mad magazine.
 James P. Dugan (1929–2021), former member of the New Jersey Senate who served as chairman of the New Jersey Democratic State Committee.
 Will Durant (1885–1981), author of The Story of Civilization and The Story of Philosophy Minkah Fitzpatrick (born 1996; class of 2015), football defensive back for the Alabama Crimson Tide and current defensive back for the Pittsburgh Steelers.
 Thomas Fleming (1927-2017, class of 1945), military historian and historical novelistMota, Caitlin. "N.J. author influenced by Jersey City politics dies at 90", The Jersey Journal, July 26, 2017. Accessed July 9, 2018. "Fleming was born in Jersey City in 1927. He graduated from St. Peter's Prep, spent one year serving in the United States Navy, and then attended Fordham University where he graduated in 1950, according to his online biography."
 John Walter Flesey (born 1942), Auxiliary Bishop of the Archdiocese of Newark.
 Najee Glass (born 1994; class of 2012), sprinter.
 Jim Hannan (born 1940), former major league baseball pitcher.Hague, Jim. "Fine night for Prep Hall of Famers" , The Hudson Reporter, May 17, 2005. Accessed July 9, 2018. "Hannan spent 10 years in the big leagues, after beginning his baseball career in Jersey City, attending St. Peter's Prep. Last week, Hannan's trip down memory lane included a stop back in his hometown, when he was among 19 former great athletes and coaches honored in the inaugural class of the St. Peter's Prep Athletic Hall of Fame at the induction dinner at Puccini's in Jersey City."
 Edward J. Hart (1893–1961; class of 1909), politician who represented New Jersey's 14th congressional district in the United States House of Representatives from 1935 to 1955
 Greg Herenda (born 1961; class of 1979), former head coach of the Fairleigh Dickinson Knights men's basketball team.
 Will Hill (born 1990; class of 2008), NFL safety who played for the New York Giants and Baltimore Ravens.
 Jon Hilliman (born 1995; class of 2014), professional football player for the New York Giants.
 Bob Hurley (born 1947; class of 1965), former head basketball coach at St. Anthony High School and 2010 Naismith Memorial Basketball Hall of Fame inducteeHague, Jim. "In company of Michael Jordan, Larry Bird Legendary JC Coach Hurley talks about Memorial Basketball Hall of Fame induction", The Hudson Reporter, August 22, 2010. Accessed July 9, 2018. "Hurley himself grew up in Jersey City. He was born and raised in the Greenville section, attending St. Paul the Apostle School, St. Peter's Prep, and St. Peter's College."
 Edward H. Hynes (born 1946), politician who served two terms in the New Jersey General Assembly.
 Rashawn Jackson (born 1987, class of 2005), professional football player for the Carolina Panthers and Oakland Raiders.
 Ken Jennings (born 1947), actor
 John V. Kelly (1926–2009), politician who served in the New Jersey General Assembly
 George A. Krol (born 1956), former United States Ambassador to Belarus and current United States Ambassador to Kazakhstan.
 Nathan Lane (born 1956, class of 1974), actor"Q&A with Nathan Lane", interview dated October 23, 2006.
 Ed Martin, politician who served as Chair of the Missouri Republican Party.
 Paolo Montalban (born 1973), actor and singer best known for his performance in the 1997 Disney television film, Rodgers & Hammerstein's Cinderella as Prince Christopher.
 Mickey Murtagh (1904-1993), professional American football player who played offensive lineman for seven seasons for the New York Giants.
 Liam O'Brien (born 1976; class of 1994), voice actor
 Edward T. O'Connor Jr. (born 1942), politician who served in the New Jersey Senate from 1982 to 2002, where he represented the 31st Legislative District.
 Tommy O'Keefe (1928–2015), former NBA basketball player, who later coached the Georgetown Hoyas men's basketball team.
 Jack Nies (born 1937), former NBA referee.
 Kyle Palmieri (born 1991), NHL right winger for the New York Islanders.
 Bill Perkins (born 1969), hedge fund manager.
 Ronald Roberts (born 1991), professional basketball player who played for Hapoel Jerusalem of the Israeli Premier League.
 Joseph Russoniello (born 1941), two-term U.S. Attorney for the Northern District of California and former Dean of San Francisco Law School.
 Rye Coalition, band founded by alumni Dave Leto, Ralph Cuseglio, and Jon Gonnelli.
 Thomas F. X. Smith (1928–1996), Mayor of Jersey City from 1977 to 1981.
 Mark Sullivan (1911–2001), justice on the New Jersey Supreme Court from 1973 to 1981
 Frank William Towey Jr. (1895-1979), member of the U.S. House of Representatives from 1937 to 1939
 Elnardo Webster (born 1969), former NFL linebacker for the Pittsburgh Steelers
 Brandon Wimbush (born 1996, class of 2015), quarterback who played for the Notre Dame Fighting Irish football team.

References

Further reading
Kinahan-Ockay, Mary and David Sambade, Saint Peter's Preparatory School.'' New Jersey City University. Jersey City Past and Present

External links 
Saint Peter's Prep Website
Data for Saint Peter's Preparatory School, National Center for Education Statistics
Bracket Information for New Jersey School Sports Provided by NJSIAA
History of Saint Peter's Prep
Crew Parent's Association

1872 establishments in New Jersey
Boys' schools in New Jersey
Educational institutions established in 1872
High schools in Jersey City, New Jersey
Jesuit high schools in the United States
Private high schools in Hudson County, New Jersey
Catholic secondary schools in New Jersey
Roman Catholic Archdiocese of Newark